Kauleshwari Temple is a pilgrimage centre where Kauleshwari Devi, a form of Sati/Kali, is worshipped. It is in the Chatra subdivision of Chatra district in Jharkhand, India.

Geography

Location
There is a bridge across the Lilajan River, which flows in between. The hilltop offers a fascinating view of the area, referred to as akash lochan (sky eye).

Note: The map alongside presents some of the notable locations in the district. All places marked in the map are linked in the larger full screen map.

Multi religious links
Thousands of devotees belonging to the Hindu, Jain and Buddhist communities visit the Kolhua Hill all round the year. The place is linked with both Ramayana and Mahabharata, the two Sanskrit epics of ancient India. While the Pandavas spent some days here during their exile (agyatvas), Rama, Sita and Lakshmana came here during their exile (vanvas). The place is also considered to be a Shakti Peetha, as the womb of Sati fell here.

A footprint found on the hill is believed to be that of the 23rd Jain tirthankara Parshvanatha. The hill had a Jain temple built in 1682. It was destroyed by invaders and a new temple was built later. There is a cave where there is a 2-foot idol of Parshvanatha, in a sitting posture. There are many broken idols in the cave. It is believed that many idols were thrown into the lake located nearby. There is a rock-cut temple with images of rock-cut Digambar Jain idols.

Gautama Buddha, on attainment of enlightenment, spent some time here before proceeding to Sarnath for preaching. He also had his head shaved here. Now-a-days, many Buddhists, come to have their heads shaved here.

Fair
During the Hindu festivals of Vasant Panchami and Ram Navami, Kolhua Mela is organised here.

References

External links

Hindu temples in Jharkhand
Tourist attractions in Jharkhand